A Family, is a 1943 Soviet film directed by Grigori Aleksandrov, Mikayil Mikayilov and Rza Takhmasib It was banned from being released in theatres by Joseph Stalin's regime censorship, for "poorly reflecting the struggle of the Soviet people against the German fascist invader".

Plot 

Tanker-shooter Najaf mistook the address of the captain's family and is in the house of sergeant Andrievsky, whose family gladly accepts him.

Starring 
 Mirza Babayev	
 Merziyye Davudova	
 O. Filippova
 Hokuma Gurbanova
 M. Jarikov
 X. Malikov
 Alekper Melikov	
 Lyubov Orlova
 V. Saripov
 Oleg Zhakov
 Kazim Ziya

References

External links 

 

1943 films
1940s Russian-language films
Soviet black-and-white films